Kathleen Casey may refer to:

Kathleen Casey, Canadian politician
Kathleen L. Casey, commissioner of the U.S. Securities and Exchange Commission